The population of the city of Seattle, in the U.S. state of Washington, was 737,015 in the 2020 United States census. Only about a fifth of the households include minor children, and more people live alone here than any other U.S. city besides San Francisco. Seattle's population is mostly white, with a relatively large minority of Asians. It has the largest African American population in the area and a Latino population that is growing quickly. About half the population are Christians (mostly Protestants) and about a third are unaffiliated.

As of a 2019 estimate, less than 30% of adults in Seattle were born in Washington state, with the majority born in other parts of the United States. Approximately 20 percent were born abroad.

Population

As of the U.S. Census of 2000, there were 563,374 people, 258,499 households, and 113,481 families residing in the city of Seattle.  The population density was 2,593.5/km2 (6,717.0/mi2).  There were 270,524 housing units at an average density of 1,245.4/km2 (3,225.4/mi2).

During the day, incoming commuters increase Seattle's population by about 30%.

According to Census 2010, there were a total of 283,510 households in Seattle. Of these, 42.9% were family households and 57.1% were non-family households. A total of 19.5% of households had children under 18 years, and 17.6% had someone over the age of 65. The average household size was 2.06, while the average family size was 2.87. The city is second-last in terms of households with children, with only 19.1% of households reporting children under 18 living with them. Only San Francisco has a lower percentage of families with children. Seattle also sports the fifth-highest percentage of adults living alone in the country.

In the city the population was spread out, with 15.6% under the age of 18, 11.9% from 18 to 24, 38.6% from 25 to 44, 21.9% from 45 to 64, and 12.0% who were 65 years of age or older.  The median age was 35 years.  For every 100 females, there were 99.5 males.  For every 100 females age 18 and over, there were 98.8 males.

The median income for a household in the city was $45,736, and the median income for a family was $62,195. Males had a median income of $40,929 versus $35,134 for females. The per capita income for the city was $30,306.  11.8% of the population and 6.9% of families were below the poverty line as were 13.8% were under the age of 18 and 10.2% are 65 or older.

Seattle has the largest African American population of any city in the Pacific Northwest, it is largely concentrated in the Central District, High Point and Rainier Beach neighborhoods, which are at least 15% Black.. While Seattle's Hispanic population is only 6.6%, it is largely concentrated on the city's South Park neighborhood. 

In addition, the city has seen a major uptick in immigration in recent decades. The foreign-born population increased 40 percent between the 1990 and 2000 census. Although the 2000 census shows only 5.28% of the population as Hispanic or Latino of any race, Hispanics are believed to be the most rapidly growing population group in Washington State, with an estimated increase of 10% just in the years 2000–2002.

Ethnic groups

According to the 2010 United States Census, Seattle had a population of 608,660 with a racial and ethnic composition as follows:
 White: 69.5% (Non-Hispanic Whites: 66.3%)
 Asian: 13.8% (4.1%  Chinese, 2.6%  Filipino, 2.2%  Vietnamese, 1.3%  Japanese, 1.1%  Korean, 0.8%  Indian, 0.3%  Indonesian, 0.3%  Cambodian, 0.3%  Laotian, 0.2%  Pakistanis, 0.2%  Thai)
 Black or African American: 7.9% (including  Somalis)
 Hispanic or Latino (of any race): 9.0% (4.0%  Mexican, 2.3%  Puerto Rican, 1.3%  Colombian, 0.2%  Guatemalan, 0.2%  Salvadoran, 0.2%  Cuban)
 American Indian and Alaska Native: 0.8%
 Native Hawaiian and Other Pacific Islander: 0.4%
 Other race: 2.4%
 Two or more races: 5.1%

The racial composition of the city in 2016 was 65.7% white, 14.1% Asian, 7.0% Black, 0.4% Native American, 0.9% Pacific Islander, 2.3% from other races, and 5.6% from two or more races. 6.6% of the population is Hispanic or Latino of any race. Amongst the city's European origin population, 11.3% were of German, 9.1% Irish, 8.1% English and 5.0% Norwegian ancestry according to Census 2000.

Religion

Seattle residents identify as mostly various types of Christian (52%), but with a large portion of irreligious. Seattle residents' current religious affiliations are shown in the table below:
Christianity 52%
Protestantism 34%
Evangelical Protestant 23%
Mainline Protestant 10%
Historically Black Protestant 1%
Catholicism 15%
Mormonism 2%
Jehovah's Witness 1%
Other Christian 1%
Non-Christian Faiths 10%
Buddhism 3%
Hinduism 1%
Judaism 1%
Other religion 5%
Unaffiliated 37%

Housing and homeless issues

Estimates of Seattle's homeless population put the number somewhere around 6,000 to 8,000 people; up to 1,000 are children and young adults. As of January 27, 2017, according to the Point-In-Time Count in Seattle/King County, an annual count of individuals, youth, and families experiencing homelessness in Seattle and King County, there were a total of 11,643 individuals experiencing homelessness, of which 47% were unsheltered, which included 13% on the street, 20% in vans or RVs, 13% in tents and 1% in abandoned buildings.

See also
Homelessness in Seattle
History of the Chinese Americans in Seattle 
 History of the Japanese in Seattle  (Japanese Americans and temporary expatriates)

References

External links

Seattle
Culture of Seattle
Economy of Seattle
Geography of Seattle
Seattle